FC Tirol Innsbruck was an Austrian association football club from Innsbruck, Tyrol which existed between 1993 and 2002, when bankruptcy was declared.

History
It was – after the establishment of FC Swarovski Tirol in 1986 – the second split-off of FC Wacker Innsbruck, whose Bundesliga license it adopted at the end of the 1992–93 season. The club, at first named FC Innsbruck Tirol, won the Austrian football championship in 2000, 2001 and 2002. Soon after winning the championship in 2002 the club had to file for bankruptcy and disbanded after losing the Bundesliga license for the season 2002/03.

Domestic history

European history
Q = Qualifying QF = Quarterfinal SF = Semifinal

Honours
 Austrian Championship (3): 1999–2000, 2000–01, 2001–02

Manager history
  Horst Köppel (1 July 1993 – 15 May 1994)
  Wolfgang Schwarz (interim) (16 May 1994 – 30 June 1994)
  Hans Krankl (1 July 1994 – 30 June 1995)
  Dietmar Constantini (1 July 1995 – 26 July 1997)
  Heinz Peischl (interim) (27 July 1997 – 4 Oct 1997)
  František Cipro (5 Oct 1997 – 31 Dec 1998)
  Kurt Jara (1 Jan 1999 – 4 Oct 2001)
  Joachim Löw (10 Oct 2001 – 30 June 2002)

External links

 
Sport in Innsbruck
Defunct football clubs in Austria
Association football clubs established in 1993
Association football clubs disestablished in 2002
1993 establishments in Austria
2002 disestablishments in Austria